Smitten may refer to:

 Infatuation
 Smitten (The Martinis album), 2004
 Smitten (Buffalo Tom album), 1998

See also
Smite (disambiguation)